Woodsmoor is a suburb of Stockport in Greater Manchester, England

The area is served by Woodsmoor railway station, opened by British Rail in 1990.

The area is populated by many large and old trees, existing since the time that it was the estate of the house which eventually became Stockport Grammar School. A former golf course links Woodsmoor with Stepping Hill and Hazel Grove.

References

Areas of Stockport